The Etherington Baronetcy, of Kingston-upon-Hull, was a title in the Baronetage of Great Britain. It was created on 22 November 1775 for Henry Etherington. He was the son and namesake of Henry Etherington, a wealthy Kingston-upon-Hull merchant. The title was made hereditary from thereon.

Etherington baronets, of Kingston-upon-Hull (1775)
Sir Henry Etherington, 1st Baronet (–1819)

References

Extinct baronetcies in the Baronetage of Great Britain